Lieutenant General Raj Mohan Vohra, PVSM, MVC (7 May 193214 June 2020) was a General Officer of the Indian Army. He was awarded the Maha Vir Chakra for his bravery and leadership in the Battle of Basantar during the Indo-Pakistani War of 1971.

Early life and education
Vohra was born on 7 May 1932 in Shimla, Himachal Pradesh, India to Bakshi Sant Ram. He attended St. Edward's School in Shimla. He had four brothers, all of whom joined the Indian Army. They all served in the Indian Armoured Corps as well. All the brothers rose to be General Officers – two Major Generals and two Lieutenant Generals.

Career
Vohra was commissioned into 14 Horse on 4 December 1952. As a major, in 1963, he was selected to attend the Defence Services Staff College, Wellington. During the Indo-Pakistani War of 1965, he fought in the Punjab sector.

Indo-Pakistani War of 1971

As a lieutenant colonel, he commanded the 4 Horse in Shakargarh sector during the Indo-Pakistani War of 1971.

On 5 December, his regiment spearheaded the advance of the 54th Infantry Division, commanded by Major General WAG Pinto, and captured well protected important positions such as Bhairo Nath, Bari Lagwal, Chamrola, Dharman, Chakra and Dehlra. During the Battle of Basantar, his regiment came under heavy fire from the enemy and faced heavy resistance but destroyed 27 enemy tanks. His unit suffered little casualties and faced repeated attacks from the enemy. He was awarded the Maha Vir Chakra for his bravery and leadership.

Maha Vir Chakra
The citation for the Maha Vir Chakra reads as follows:

As a General Officer, Vohra commanded the Army War College, Mhow (then called College of Combat), which was also commanded by his brother, Inder Mohan Vohra. Vohra served as the General Officer Commanding-in-Chief of the Eastern Command from 1988 to 1990.

Honours and decorations

Death
He died on 14 June 2020 from COVID-19 during the COVID-19 pandemic in India.

References

External links

2020 deaths
Recipients of the Param Vishisht Seva Medal
1932 births
Recipients of the Maha Vir Chakra
Indian generals
People from Shimla
Deaths from the COVID-19 pandemic in India
Commandants of Army War College, Mhow
Defence Services Staff College alumni